This is a list of the lakes and reservoirs of Oregon.

Gallery

See also 

 List of dams and reservoirs in Oregon
 Lists of Oregon-related topics
 List of rivers of Oregon

References 

 
Lakes
Oregon